Ryan Jeffrey Archibald  (born 1 September 1980) is a field hockey player from New Zealand, who earned his first cap for the national team, nicknamed The Black Sticks, in 1997 against Malaysia. Currently he is a player for Somerville Hockey Club.

In the 2021 Queen's Birthday Honours, Archibald was appointed a Member of the New Zealand Order of Merit, for services to hockey.

International senior tournaments
 1998 – Sultan Azlan Shah Cup
 1998 – Commonwealth Games
 1999 – Sultan Azlan Shah Cup
 2000 – Olympic Qualifier
 2000 – Sultan Azlan Shah Cup
 2001 – World Cup Qualifier
 2002 – World Cup
 2002 – Commonwealth Games
 2003 – Sultan Azlan Shah Cup
 2003 – Champions Challenge
 2004 – Olympic Qualifier
 2004 – Champions Trophy
 2005 – Sultan Azlan Shah Cup
 2006 – Commonwealth Games
 2006 – Hockey World Cup
 2007 – Champions Challenge
 2008 – Olympic Games
 2012 – Olympic Games

References

External links
 
 Profile on New Zealand Hockey

1980 births
Living people
New Zealand male field hockey players
Olympic field hockey players of New Zealand
Field hockey players at the 1998 Commonwealth Games
Field hockey players at the 2002 Commonwealth Games
Field hockey players at the 2006 Commonwealth Games
Field hockey players at the 2008 Summer Olympics
Commonwealth Games medallists in field hockey
Commonwealth Games silver medallists for New Zealand
Field hockey players at the 2012 Summer Olympics
Field hockey players at the 2016 Summer Olympics
2002 Men's Hockey World Cup players
2006 Men's Hockey World Cup players
2010 Men's Hockey World Cup players
Field hockey players from Auckland
HC Rotterdam players
New Zealand expatriate sportspeople in the Netherlands
Expatriate field hockey players
Members of the New Zealand Order of Merit
Medallists at the 2002 Commonwealth Games